Angela Bradburn-Spangler (born September 4, 1968, in Fort Wayne, Indiana) is a retired high jumper from the United States, who set her outdoor personal best on May 28, 1994, jumping 1.95 metres at a meet in Wörrstadt. Her indoor best is 1.98 metres set on March 5, 1994, in Atlanta. She is the 1994 US national champion and three-time US national indoor champion (1992, 1994 and 1997).

Competition record

Note: Results with a q, indicate overall position in qualifying round.

References
 
 USATF profile
 Player Bio: Angela Bradburn Spangler at Texas Longhorns

1968 births
Living people
American female high jumpers
Athletes (track and field) at the 1995 Pan American Games
Athletes (track and field) at the 1999 Pan American Games
Sportspeople from Fort Wayne, Indiana
Pan American Games bronze medalists for the United States
Pan American Games medalists in athletics (track and field)
Track and field athletes from Indiana
World Athletics Championships athletes for the United States
Competitors at the 1994 Goodwill Games
Medalists at the 1995 Pan American Games
21st-century American women